The 69th Punjabis were an infantry regiment of the British Indian Army. They could trace their origins to 1759, when they were raised as the 10th Battalion Coast Sepoys.

The regiment's first engagement was during the Carnatic Wars, this was followed by service during the Battle of Sholinghur in the Second Anglo-Mysore War and the Third Anglo-Mysore War. They also took part in the annexation of Pegu during the Second Anglo-Burmese War.

The Battalion was awarded the Galley Badge in 1839 for 'readiness always evinced' for proceeding on foreign service, which was then considered a taboo in India. The Galley is now the crest of the Indian Punjab Regiment. The Battalion was also given the Battle Cry - Khushki Wuh Tarri which is Persian for 'By Land and Sea'. The Indianised version of this motto 'Sthal Wuh Jal' is now the Battle Cry of the Indian Punjab Regiment.

In early 1900 the regiment was stationed at Colombo.
 
During World War I they served in the Middle East on the Suez Canal and in the Gallipoli Campaign after which they were sent to the Western Front in 1915.
 
After World War I the Indian government reformed the army moving from single battalion regiments to multi battalion regiments. In 1922, the 69th Punjabis became the 2nd Battalion, 2nd Punjab Regiment. After independence they were one of the regiments allocated to the Indian Army.

Gen KM Cariappa, OBE, the first Indian Commander in Chief, decided that the four senior most Infantry Battalions of the Army should form the Brigade of the Guards, and thus 2/2 Punjab was converted to the First Battalion Brigade of the  Guards (2 PUNJAB) in 1951. The Battalion has the distinction of being the most senior Infantry Battalion of the Indian Army.

Predecessor names
10th Battalion Coast Sepoys - 1759
10th Carnatic Battalion - 1769
9th Carnatic Battalion - 1770
9th Madras Battalion - 1784
1st Battalion, 9th Madras Native Infantry - 1796
9th Madras Native Infantry - 1824
9th Madras Infantry - 1885
69th Punjabis - 1903

References

Sources

Moberly, F.J. (1923). Official History of the War: Mesopotamia Campaign, Imperial War Museum. 

British Indian Army infantry regiments
Military history of the Madras Presidency
Military units and formations established in 1759
Military units and formations disestablished in 1922